The Croatian Province of the Society of Jesus is a province of the Society of Jesus, or the Jesuits, of the Catholic Church which is active in Croatia, Bosnia and Herzegovina and the Republic of Macedonia. 

The Society of Jesus runs a faculty of philosophy at the University of Zagreb (separate from the main, secular faculty of philosophy) as well as the Student Catholic Centre within the Archdiocese of Zagreb. It has parishes in Rijeka and Zagreb. 

The Province also maintains residences in Sarajevo, Bosnia and Herzegovina, and Ohrid, Macedonia, where they provide religious education to seminarians in the local dioceses.

External links 
Croatian Province of the Society of Jesus

Society of Jesus
Catholic Church in Croatia
Catholic Church in Bosnia and Herzegovina
Catholic Church in North Macedonia